Atsiapat, also spelt atsapat, is the first in a sequence of three Greek traditional male dances performed in the region of Pontus, as well as by refugees of Pontos. Atsapat is characterized by short steps and exaggerated movements that resemble stretching. This dance is followed directly by Serra. The final dance in the sequence is the Pyrrhichios.

Atsapat is the Greek pronunciation of the Pontic Turkish city of Akçaabat. The region is famous for the virtuosity of its Pyrrhichios dancers.

See also
 Pyrrhichios
 Korybantes
 Greek dances
 Greek music

References

External links
 The official website of the Pontian Federation of Greece
 Pontian Federation of Australia
 Pontian Association in Stuttgart, Germany

Greek music
Pontic Greek dances